Mabel Barrison (April 21, 1882 - November 1, 1912) was a Canadian born American stage actress and singer in the first decade of the 20th century. She was born Eva Farrance and joined a musical chorus while still in her teens. She appeared in vaudeville and on Broadway with Weber and Fields and was spotted by stage director Julian Mitchell for a role in the 1903 Babes in Toyland. "The Blue Mouse" was written by Clyde Fitch and Fitch himself selected Barrison for a role in the play. Barrison was plagued by health problems the last two years of her life. She died on November 1, 1912 in Toronto at the age of 30.

Broadway plays
Florodora (1900)
Twirly Whirly(1902)
Humming Birds and Onions (1902)
The Stickiness of Gelatine (1902)
The Big Little Princess (1903)
Babes in Toyland (1903)
Babes in Toyland (1905)(revival)
The Land of Nod and The Song Birds (1907)
The Flower of the Ranch (1908)
The Blue Mouse (1908)
Lulu's Husbands (1910)

See also
Lotta Faust

References

External links

1882 births
1912 deaths
Actresses from Toronto
American stage actresses
Canadian emigrants to the United States
Musicians from Toronto
20th-century American actresses
20th-century American singers
Vaudeville performers
20th-century American women singers